Calliotropis chuni is a species of sea snail; a marine gastropod mollusk in the family Eucyclidae.

Description

Distribution

References

 Vilvens C. (2007) New records and new species of Calliotropis from Indo-Pacific. Novapex 8 (Hors Série 5): 1–72.

External links

chuni
Gastropods described in 1904